Tycho Weißgerber (born 10 July 1952) is a German fencer. He competed in the team sabre event at the 1976 Summer Olympics.

References

1952 births
Living people
German male fencers
Olympic fencers of West Germany
Fencers at the 1976 Summer Olympics
People from Neunkirchen District, Austria